Arjun Narasingha K.C. (born 27 September 1950) is a Nepali politician belonging to the Nepali Congress. KC was appointed minister five times in different coalition governments. He most served as the Minister of Urban Development in the Second Dahal Cabinet from 2016 to 2017. KC has been elected to the national legislature a total of three times from his constituency of Nuwakot.

He was the Joint General Secretary of the Nepali Congress (NC) and the spokesperson of the party.

Education

KC holds a master's degree in political science. He was a Professor in the Political Science department at the Tribhuvan University.

Political career
KC won a seat in the 1981 Rastriya Panchayat Election, contesting as an independent at the instructions of the senior Congress leadership. KC first served as the State Minister for Health under Surya Bahadur Thapa from 1982 to 1983 and then as the Minister for Health, Education and Physical Planning from 1995 to 1999. KC was elected as a member of parliament twice in the 1991 and 1994 parliamentary elections.

KC lost in the 2017 elections to Narayan Khatiwada . He is now a senior member of the Central Committee of the Nepali Congress party. In the 14th General Convention, KC played a leading role forming the Koirala-KC-Thapa panel."

References

External links
 Nepali Congress
 Arjun Narasingha K.C. 

People from Nuwakot District
Government ministers of Nepal
Members of the National Assembly (Nepal)
Tribhuvan University alumni
Members of the Rastriya Panchayat
Nepal MPs 1991–1994
Nepal MPs 1994–1999
Nepali Congress politicians from Bagmati Province
Nepalese Hindus
1950 births
People of the Nepalese Civil War
Living people
Nepali Congress
Khas people
Members of the 2nd Nepalese Constituent Assembly
Nepal MPs 2022–present